Filip Borlovan (born 25 November 1909, date of death unknown) was a Romanian wrestler. He competed in the men's Greco-Roman lightweight at the 1936 Summer Olympics.

References

External links
 

1909 births
Year of death missing
Romanian male sport wrestlers
Olympic wrestlers of Romania
Wrestlers at the 1936 Summer Olympics
Place of birth missing